Dzerzhinsky (masculine), Dzerzhinskaya (feminine), or Dzerzhinskoye (neuter) may refer to:

People
Felix Dzerzhinsky (1877–1926), Communist revolutionary, founder of the Cheka
Ivan Dzerzhinsky (1909–1978), Russian composer
Sofia Dzerzhinskaya (1882–1968), Polish politician

Places
Dzerzhinsky District (disambiguation), name of several districts in the countries of the former Soviet Union
Dzerzhinsky (inhabited locality) (Dzerzhinskaya, Dzerzhinskoye), name of several inhabited localities in Russia
Dzerzhinski, the former name of Aygevan, a village in Armenia
Dzerzhinskoe, the former name of Besagash, a village in Kazakhstan

Other uses
Dzerzhinskaya Line, a line of the Novosibirsk Metro
, a Sverdlov-class cruiser
Dzerzhinsky, a canceled 
Steam locomotive FD, also known as the Felix Dzerzhinsky-class of Soviet steam locomotives
Dzerzhinskaya, the name of the Lubyanka station of the Moscow Metro in 1935–1990
Dzerzhinskaya, until 1994, the name of the Universytet station of the Kharkiv Metro
Dzerzhinskaya, former name of the Lybidska station of the Kyiv Metro
Dzerzhynska (Kryvyi Rih Metrotram), a station of the Kryvyi Rih Metrotram

See also
Dzerzhinsk (disambiguation)
Imeni Dzerzhinskogo (disambiguation)